Lisa Raymond and Rennae Stubbs were the defending champions and won in the final 6–3, 7–5 against Lindsay Davenport and Jana Novotná.

Seeds
Champion seeds are indicated in bold text while text in italics indicates the round in which those seeds were eliminated.

 Martina Hingis /  Arantxa Sánchez Vicario (first round)
 Lindsay Davenport /  Jana Novotná (final)
n/a
 Yayuk Basuki /  Caroline Vis (first round)

Draw

External links
 1997 Advanta Championships of Philadelphia Doubles Draw

Advanta Championships of Philadelphia
1997 WTA Tour